Antonio Macia is an American screenwriter and actor.  The son of Argentine and Chilean immigrants, Antonio was born and raised in Stamford, Connecticut. He graduated from Middlebury College with a degree in International Studies. He then served a two-year mission for the Church of Jesus Christ of Latter-day Saints in Toronto, Ontario, Canada where he worked with Hispanic communities.

In 2002, Macia wrote and co-starred in his first feature film, Anne B. Real.  The film was nominated for two Independent Spirit Awards.

Macia wrote the screenplay for the 2010 film Holy Rollers.

Filmography

References

External links
 

Year of birth missing (living people)
Living people
American male screenwriters
American male film actors
Middlebury College alumni
American Mormon missionaries in Canada
Male actors from Stamford, Connecticut
American people of Argentine descent
American people of Chilean descent
Latter Day Saints from Connecticut
Latter Day Saints from Vermont
Screenwriters from Connecticut